The 2020 New Mexico Democratic presidential primary took place on June 2, 2020, as one of eight delayed and regular primaries on the same day in the Democratic Party primaries for the 2020 presidential election. The New Mexico primary was a closed primary, with the state awarding 46 delegates to the 2020 Democratic National Convention, of whom 34 were pledged delegates allocated on the basis of the primary results.

Former vice president and presumptive nominee Joe Biden won the primary with roughly 73% of the vote and won 30 delegates, helping him cross the necessary majority of 1,991 delegates and officially win the Democratic nomination three days later during the vote count, while senator Bernie Sanders, who had suspended his campaign two months earlier, narrowly passed the threshold of 15% and received 4 delegates and senator Elizabeth Warren, also withdrawn, received most of the remaining votes with around 6%.

Procedure
New Mexico was one of seven states and the District of Columbia that voted on June 2, 2020 in the Democratic primaries, along with Indiana, Maryland, Montana, Pennsylvania, Rhode Island and South Dakota. Four of these states had moved their elections to June due to the COVID-19 pandemic in the United States.

Voting took place throughout the state from 7 a.m. until 7 p.m. In the closed primary, candidates had to meet a threshold of 15% at the congressional district or statewide level in order to be considered viable. The 34 pledged delegates to the 2020 Democratic National Convention were allocated proportionally on the basis of the primary results. Of these, between 5 and 9 were allocated to each of the state's 3 congressional districts and another 4 were allocated to party leaders and elected officials (PLEO delegates), in addition to 7 at-large delegates. Originally planned with 29 delegates, the final number included a 20% bonus of 5 additional delegates on the 19 district and 6 at-large delegates by the Democratic National Committee due to the June date, which belonged to Stage III on the primary timetable.

State delegates first voted on district-level delegates for the national convention at district conventions on June 13, and then voted on the 7 at-large and 4 pledged PLEO delegates at the state post-primary convention between June 19 and June 20. The delegation also included 12 unpledged PLEO delegates: 5 members of the Democratic National Committee, 5 members of Congress (both senators and all 3 representatives), the governor Michelle Lujan Grisham, and former DNC chair Fred R. Harris.

Candidates
The following candidates appeared on the ballot:

Running
Joe Biden
Withdrawn

Tulsi Gabbard
Deval Patrick
Bernie Sanders
Elizabeth Warren
Andrew Yang

There was also an option for uncommitted delegates.

Polling

Results

See also
2020 New Mexico Republican presidential primary

Notes

References

External links
The Green Papers delegate allocation summary
New Mexico Democratic Party draft delegate selection plan

New Mexico Democratic
Democratic primary
2020